The Brian Clarke Church of England Academy is a co-educational Church of England free school for 11- to 16-year-olds, located in the town centre of Oldham, Greater Manchester, England.

The school caters to pupils aged 11–16, offering GCSE courses. It is temporarily located at The Blue Coat School, and construction on the purpose-built new school complex is planned to be completed by April 2023.

The school is named after the artist Brian Clarke, painter and stained-glass designer, who was born in Oldham. The motto of the school is Luceat Lux Vestra, from Matthew 5:16: "let your light shine".

History 
In 2018 Cranmer Education Trust's CEO Julie Hollis applied to the Department for Education for a new secondary school in Oldham. Planning permission was granted in April 2021, with construction in progress.

See also 

 The Blue Coat School
 List of schools in Oldham

References

External links 
 The official Brian Clarke Church of England Academy website

Church of England secondary schools in the Diocese of Manchester
Educational institutions established in 2022
2022 establishments in England
Secondary schools in the Metropolitan Borough of Oldham
Free schools in England